The Indemnity Ordinance, 1975 was a controversial law enacted by the martial law regime of Bangladesh on 26 September 1975. It provided legal immunity to all persons involved in the assassination of Sheikh Mujibur Rahman, who was killed with most of his family on 15 August 1975. Immunity meant the assassins were immune from any legal action. The surviving family members of Sheikh Mujibur Rahman were unable to file a murder case against the assassins due to this law.

The ordinance was converted into an Act of Parliament by the Bangladesh Nationalist Party on 9 July 1979 through the Indemnity Act, 1979. When the Awami League led by Sheikh Mujib's surviving daughter Sheikh Hasina was elected to power in 1996, the law was repealed through the Indemnity (Repeal) Act, 1996.

Provisions
Published in an Extraordinary Bangladesh Gazette, the main purpose of the ordinance was described as being:-

to restrict the taking of any legal or other proceedings in respect of certain acts or things done in connection with, or in preparation execution of any plan for, or steps necessitating, the historical change and the proclamation of Martial Law on the morning of the 15th August, 1975.

Whereas it is expedient to restrict the taking of any legal or other proceedings in respect of certain acts or things done in connection with or in preparation or execution of any plan for, or steps necessitating, the historical change and the proclamation of Martial Law on the morning of the 15th August, 1975.

Legacy
Due to the indemnity law, most of the assassins continued live freely in Bangladesh without any legal repercussions for their actions. Some were even appointed as diplomats of the Bangladeshi government. Two of the assassins, including Colonels Khandaker Abdur Rashid and Syed Faruque Rahman, admitted to killing Sheikh Mujib in TV interviews. The self-confessed assassins regularly traveled abroad. By the time of the law's repeal in 1996, most of them were absconding abroad and became fugitives from the law. As of 2022, many of the assassins continue to be fugitives, including Colonel Rashid.

This indemnity law has been described as "the darkest law in the history of Bangladesh". According to Mahfuz Anam, "In independent Bangladesh, the first unfortunate entry of military into politics was the dastardly murder of Bangabandhu along with his family (save two daughters) by a section of army officers and troops. This was followed by the killing of four national leaders in the jail, coming of power of Gen Ziaur Rahman, his shameful act of indemnifying Bangabandhu's killers and the subsequent tragedy of his killing by another section of the armed forces. None of these brought any credit to our army and contributed in making them more and more controversial and their intervention into politics hated by the people in general".

See also
Military coups in Bangladesh

References

History of Bangladesh (1971–present)
Politics of Bangladesh
Political repression in Bangladesh
Repealed Bangladeshi legislation
Assassination of Sheikh Mujibur Rahman